Vatandar (or Watandar) is an Indian term meaning "landholder".  The title was given to landowners, particularly in Maharashtra.

The vatandar generally owned a plot of land or vatan/watan worked by the local people, who were dependent on the vatandar for their subsistence. In some cases, vatan land and the title vatandar were awarded to an individual by a higher ruler as reward for meritorious service.

The grant of a watan plot differed from the grant of an inam and a person might hold either or both. While a watan was a hereditary rent-free grant to a village resident in lieu of services that the resident was expected to perform for the village on an ongoing basis, an inam was granted in recognition of past service to the state, usually but not always in relation to the military. A watan grant continued for as long as its holder had the confidence of the village community, whilst an inam grant, which might also take the form of a share of village land revenues, was held in perpetuity.

See also 
Bara Balutedar
Jagir
Ryot
Zamindar
Vatandar (SuperApplication)

References 

The State and the Village Community in Medieval Maharashtra (Seventeenth-Eighteenth Century AD)/Mily Roy Anand. New Delhi, Rajat, 2005, vii, 119 p., .
http://www.maharashtra.gov.in/english/gazetteer/Ahmadnagar/gen_admin_collector.html
Medieval Indian History. Krishnaji Nageshrao Chitnis. Atlantic Publishers & Distributors, 2003 , 978-81-7156-062-2. 
Administrative System of the Marathas. Surendra Nath Sen, Published by K. P. Bagchi, 1976 Pg. 18,21,141

Social history of India
Indian feudalism
Titles of national or ethnic leadership